KAPZ (710 AM) was a radio station formerly licensed to Bald Knob, Arkansas, United States. The station was owned by Crain Media Group, LLC.

The station's license was cancelled by the Federal Communications Commission on July 28, 2011, and its call sign deleted from the FCC's database.

References

External links
 Query the FCC's AM station database for KAPZ

APZ
Radio stations disestablished in 2011
Defunct radio stations in the United States
2011 disestablishments in Arkansas
APZ
APZ